The 2014 Melbourne Victory FC W-League season in soccer was the club's seventh participation in the W-League, since the league's formation in 2008.

Players

Squad information

Transfers in

Transfers out

Competitions

Overall

W-League

Fixtures

League table

Results summary

Results by round

Goal scorers

W-League Finals series

International Women's Club Championship

Matches

Awards
 Player of the Week (Round 3) – Lisa De Vanna
 Player of the Week (Round 5) – Amy Jackson
 Player of the Week (Round 10) – Christine Nairn
 Player of the Week (Round 11) – Racheal Quigley

References

External links
 Official Website

Melbourne Victory FC (A-League Women) seasons
Melbourne Victory